Oscar Rivas is a Paraguayan environmentalist. He was awarded the Goldman Environmental Prize in 2000, jointly with Elias Diaz Peña, for their efforts to protect the ecosystems of the Paraná River and the Paraguay River, in particular consequences from the Yacyretá Dam project.

References 

Year of birth missing (living people)
Living people
Paraguayan activists
Paraguayan environmentalists
Goldman Environmental Prize awardees